Loaf Island (52°50'N 173°12E) is a small satellite of Attu Island in the Near Islands group at the extreme western end of the Aleutian Islands, Alaska.  Loaf Island is situated in Massacre Bay on the southeast side of Attu.  It was named by the U.S. Army during its occupation of Attu during World War II.

Near Islands
Islands of Alaska
Islands of Unorganized Borough, Alaska